Forest Ridge School District 142 is a school district headquartered in Oak Forest, Illinois in Greater Chicago.

Schools
 Jack Hille Middle School
 Lee R. Foster Elementary School
 G. Kerkstra Elementary School
 Ridge Early Childhood Center

References

External links
 
School districts in Cook County, Illinois